Baruch Charney Vladeck (born Baruch Nachman Charney; January 13, 1886 – October 30, 1938) was an American labor leader, manager of The Jewish Daily Forward for twenty years, and a member of the New York City Council.

Biography

Early years
Baruch Charney was born January 13, 1886, in Dukor, a small village near Minsk, in what is now Belarus. His parents were Zev Volf and Brokhe Tsharni (née Hurwitz). His father, a fervent Lubavitcher Hasid, died in 1889, leaving his mother a widow with five sons (he was the fifth) and a daughter. Two of his older brothers also achieved renown: literary critic Shmuel Niger and Yiddish poet Daniel Charney.

In the early 1900s, Baruch Charney was drawn to the revolutionary movement for the overthrow of the Tsarist autocracy, becoming an activist in the Jewish Labour Bund. As an underground revolutionary, open use of his real name was regarded as highly dangerous to both him and his family, so the pseudonym "Vladeck" was adopted as a nom de guerre. Baruch Charney would use this as his surname for the rest of his life.

Vladeck was arrested in 1904 for conducting a radical study circle for young workers, and was imprisoned for a total of 8 months as a result of this first arrest. He was arrested again in 1905 and faced an extensive exile in Siberia, a fate from which he was saved by the outbreak of the Revolution of 1905 and the political amnesties which accompanied that seminal event.

The 1905 revolution ended in Tsarist restoration by 1907 and a period of reaction ensued. Vladeck came to feel that emigration to the United States was his most realistic option. In 1908 he left Europe for North America, landing at Ellis Island, soon after which he began to immerse himself in the study of American history and culture.

American political activity

In America, Vladeck made use of his previous experience as a public speaker, traveling extensively for four years and giving public lectures on a variety of social, political, and economic topics.

Vladeck joined the staff of the socialist The Jewish Daily Forward in 1912 as manager of its Philadelphia branch while also studying at the Teachers' College of the University of Pennsylvania. In 1918 he became manager of the paper, and remained in that position until his death in 1938. He was also a member of the National Press Club.

In 1917 Vladeck was elected to the New York Board of Aldermen as a Socialist. He was defeated in 1921 but was re-elected in 1937 to the newly formed New York City Council running on the American Labor Party ticket. Vladeck was also at the forefront of establishing public housing for low-income residents and in 1934 was named by Mayor LaGuardia to the New York City Housing Authority.

In 1933 Vladeck laid the groundwork for the Jewish Labor Committee, which was formed by Jewish trade unionists, socialists, and kindred groups and individuals to oppose the rise of Nazism in Germany. The JLC had its founding convention the following February, in New York's Lower East Side; Vladeck was the organization's president from the convention until his death. He, together with Jewish trade union leaders, successfully convinced the American Federation of Labor to support a national boycott of German goods at the labor federation's 1933 convention.

Death and legacy
Vladeck died on October 30, 1938, at the age of 52 from a coronary thrombosis. His funeral procession through the Lower East Side and ending outside the Forward building drew 500,000 mourners. Among the speakers at the service were Governor Herbert Lehman, Mayor Fiorello La Guardia, Senator Robert F. Wagner and Socialist leader Norman Thomas. Vladeck's papers are housed at Tamiment Library at New York University.

Today the Vladeck Houses public housing project on the Lower East Side of Manhattan bear his name, as does nearby "Vladeck Park."  The Amalgamated Housing Cooperative in the Bronx contains a lecture hall named Vladeck Hall.

Vladeck's son was civil rights lawyer Stephen C. Vladeck (1920–1979) and his daughter-in-law was renowned labor lawyer Judith Vladeck.

Footnotes

Sources consulted
 "B.C. Vladeck Dies; City Councilman," New York Times, 31 Oct. 1938: p. 1.
 "Half Million See Vladeck Funeral," New York Times, 3 Nov. 1938: p. 28.

Works
 B. Vladeck in Leben un Shafen. New York: Forverts, 1936.

Further reading
 Melech Epstein, Profiles of Eleven. Detroit: Wayne State University Press, 1965.
 John Herling, "Baruch Charney Vladeck," in American Jewish Yearbook 41. New York: American Jewish Committee, 1939–1940.
 Harold B. Hunting, "A Revolutionist Devoid of Hate," in Distinguished American Jews. Philip Henry Lotz, ed. New York: Associated Press, 1945.
 Ephraim Jeshurin, B.C. Vladeck: Fifty Years of Life and Labor. New York: 1932.
 Franklin L. Jonas, The Early Life and Career of B. Charney Vladeck. Ph.D. dissertation, New York University, 1972.
 Brian Dolber, "Sweating for Democracy: Working Class Media and the Struggle for 'Hegemonic Jewishness,' 1919–1941." Ph.D. dissertation, University of Illinois, Urbana-Champaign, 2011.
 Brian Dolber, "Strange Bedfellows: Yiddish socialist radio and the collapse of broadcasting reform in the United States, 1927–1938." Historical Journal of Film, Television, and Radio, 2013, Vol. 33(2), 289–307.

External links
 Finding Aid for the Baruch Charney Vladeck papers, Tamiment Library, New York University.
 "Baruch Charney Vladeck," Our Campaigns.com biography.
 Labor and the Holocaust: The Jewish Labor Committee and the Anti-Nazi Struggle (Origins)
 Labor and the Holocaust: The Jewish Labor Committee and the Anti-Nazi Struggle (Anti-Nazi Activity 1930s)

1886 births
1938 deaths
American Ashkenazi Jews
People from Puchavičy District
Belarusian Jews
Bundists
Emigrants from the Russian Empire to the United States
Socialist Party of America politicians from New York (state)
Jewish American people in New York (state) politics
Jewish socialists
University of Pennsylvania alumni
Jewish American trade unionists